FC Saturn Ramenskoye is a Russian football club, based in the town of Ramenskoye in Moscow Oblast. It is also sometimes referred to as FC Saturn Moscow Region.

History
The club was founded in 1946. Although the club is based in Ramenskoye, the club represents all Moscow Oblast. Due to huge debts it was dissolved in January 2011, but was recreated on the base of their former farm club FC Saturn-2 Moscow Region. It returned to the professional level in Russian Professional Football League in the 2013–14 season. Before the 2015–16 season, the club didn't receive the professional license and moved back to amateur levels. It returned to the third-tier once again for the 2016–17 season.

Their nickname “Aliens” (Russian инопланетяне) comes from the name 'Saturn'.
Also, nicknamed "Extraterrestrials."

It was previously called Krylya Sovetov (1946–1957), Trud (1958–1959) and Saturn-REN TV (February 2002 to January 2004).
In 2006 the club beat the record of drawn matches played in the Russian Premier League during one season - 16 times.

League and Cup history

Saturn's reserve squad played professionally as FC Saturn-2 Ramenskoye in the Russian Second Division in 1999 and 2000. Since 2004 exists a separate farm club — Saturn Yegoryevsk, since 2008 called Saturn-2, played in the Russian Second Division to 2012.

Current squad
As of 22 February 2023, according to the Second League website.

Supporters

The football club Saturn Ramenskoye (FCSR) supporters movement was born in the second part of the 1980s when the team started playing on the professional level. The organised group of fans at that time consisted of not more than 20 people; however the first trips (Russian: выезда) to Tula, Kaluga, Pskov and other cities were already done by them in 1986.

The new age for FCSR supportive movement is connected with the year 1995. Then the famous supporter Andrey Egorishev (nicknamed "Arsenal") had begun to unite fans of Saturn. It is believed that the team played in black and blue colors because of him. In 1996 Saturn had played in red and white colors. Fans who disliked these colors (because of ideological views) had many discussions – and finally chose black and blue colors. Some time after that the team changed colors too.

The first union of FCSR fans – Dorf Menschen (the bumpkins; the German translates literally as "Village People") – was organised in January 1996. At that moment it consisted from about 15 people, but its size (as the size of FCSR fans in common) has been increasing. Many groups of fans were formed (mainly according to geographical location). Because a large number of these groups became uncontrollable, it was decided to unite them around a Dorf Menschen. The South-East Confederation (Russian: «Юго-Восточная Конфедерация») was formed in this way. It was able to gather about one thousand  supporters at the home game. At the moment the main FCSR band is "BBS firm" whose name means "Black Blue Supporters".

After beginning to play in the highest Russian league, the structure of the FCSR supportive movement has been changed a lot. There are some different unions at the moment, both hooligans and ultras, which are united by the 46 km. The main enemies of Saturn fans are fans of FC Lokomotiv Moscow, FC Shinnik Yaroslavl and FC Khimki. There is the friendship between FCSR fans and fans of Torpedo Moscow and Spartak Moscow.

Many FCSR fans' nicknames are connected with the aliens' club name. The black and blue fans themselves mostly use the nickname gumy ("гумы") (short form of Russian "гуманоид" – "humanoid").

Notable players
Had international caps for their respective countries. Players whose name is listed in bold represented their countries while playing for Saturn.

USSR/Russia
 Yuri Gavrilov
   Andrei Kanchelskis
 Andrei Afanasyev
 Nikita Bazhenov
 Maksim Buznikin
 Pyotr Bystrov
 Valeri Chizhov
 Vadim Evseev
 Aleksei Igonin
 Andrei Karyaka
 Valery Kechinov
 Yevgeni Kharlachyov
 Dmitri Kirichenko
 Valeri Kleimyonov
 Dmitri Loskov 
 Andrey Lunyov
 Viktor Onopko
 Roman Shirokov
 Artyom Rebrov
 Sergey Ryzhikov
 Vladislav Ternavski
 Roman Vorobyov
 Valery Yesipov

Former USSR countries
 Andrey Movsisyan
 Vladimir Korytko

 Konstantin Kovalenko
 Leonid Kovel
 Gogita Gogua
 Dmitriy Lyapkin
 Radu Rebeja
 Serghei Rogaciov
 Oleg Shishkin
 Adrian Sosnovschi
 Sergei Piskaryov
 Akhmed Yengurazov
 Farkhod Vasiev
  Oleksandr Horshkov
 Andriy Husin
 Yevhen Levchenko
 Dmytro Parfenov
 Oleksandr Pomazun
 Vyacheslav Sviderskiy
 Pavel Solomin

Europe
 Samir Duro
 Samir Muratović
 Omer Joldić
 Marko Topić
 Antonín Kinský
 Alexei Eremenko
 Boris Rotenberg

 Edgaras Česnauskis
 Rolandas Džiaukštas
 Simon Vukčević
 Dušan Petković
 Ján Ďurica
 Branislav Fodrek
 Martin Jakubko
 Kamil Kopúnek
 Branislav Obžera
 Peter Petráš

Central America
 Winston Parks

South America
 Pablo Horacio Guiñazu
 Daniel Montenegro
 Fredy Bareiro
 Martín Hidalgo
 Javier Delgado

Africa
 Benoît Angbwa
 Prince Koranteng Amoako
 Baffour Gyan
 Illiasu Shilla
 Solomon Okoronkwo

References

External links

Official website

 
1946 establishments in Russia
Association football clubs established in 1946
Football in Moscow Oblast
Football clubs in Russia